The Hawk Is Howling is the sixth studio album by the Scottish post-rock band Mogwai, released on 22 September 2008, by Wall of Sound, Play It Again Sam and Matador in the UK, Europe, and the US, respectively. It was released in Australia by Spunk Records on 27 September 2008.

It is their first album of exclusively instrumental songs, since their earlier albums have all had vocals (singing or spoken word) on some tracks.

The album peaked at number 35 in the UK Album Charts and 97 on the Billboard 200.

Writing and recording 
The album was recorded and produced by Andy Miller at Chem19 Studios in Hamilton, South Lanarkshire, Scotland and mixed by Gareth Jones at Castle of Doom Studios in Glasgow, Scotland, between September 2007 and March 2008. The album was the first time in ten years that the band had worked with Andy Miller, and at Chem19 Studios, since recording the song "Small Children in the Background" for the No Education = No Future (Fuck the Curfew) EP in May 1998.

Several new compositions were debuted at a show for the Triptych Festival at Tramway in Glasgow in April 2008 — "The Precipice", "I Love You, I'm Going to Blow Up Your School", "I'm Jim Morrison, I'm Dead", "Thank You Space Expert", "Batcat" and "Scotland's Shame".

In 2012 it was awarded a gold certification from the Independent Music Companies Association, which indicated sales of at least 75,000 copies throughout Europe.

Track listing 
All tracks composed by Mogwai.

The limited edition version contains the documentation "Adelia, I Want To Love: A Film About Mogwai by Vincent Moon and Teresa Eggers", the Dominic Hailstone-directed "Batcat" video and the video "Batcat Animation" created by Fernando Alberto Mena Rojas.

Personnel 
Mogwai
 Dominic Aitchison – bass guitar
 Stuart Braithwaite – guitar
 Martin Bulloch – drums
 Barry Burns – guitar, keyboard
 John Cummings – guitar

Additional personnel
 James Aparicio – mixing assistance
 Nadia Bradley – photography and design
 Tony Doogan – recording of "The Sun Smells Too Loud"
 Gareth Jones – mixing
 Andy Miller – producer
 Andi Whitelock – recording of bowed mandolin on "Scotland's Shame"

References 

2008 albums
Mogwai albums
Matador Records albums
PIAS Recordings albums
Wall of Sound (record label) albums
Instrumental rock albums